Sashi is a 2021 Indian Telugu-language romantic drama film written and directed by Srinivas Naidu Nadikatla and jointly produced by R.  P. Varma, Chavali Ramanjaneyulu and Chintalapudi Srinivasa Rao under the banner of Sri Hanuman Movie Makers. The film features Aadi Saikumar and Surbhi in the lead roles. The film was released on 19 March 2021.

Plot 

A singer in a local band has issues with anger management and alcohol. A tragedy that occurred in his past tips him over the edge. He then starts stalking a girl whose mental health was impacted due to a similar tragedy that occurred in her life.

Cast
 Aadi Saikumar as Raj a.k.a. Rajkumar
 Surbhi as Sashi
 Rashi Singh as Sunitha, Raj's friend
 Jayaprakash as Dhora
 Ajay as Ajay, Raj's brother
 Sharanya Pradeep as Padma, Ajay's love-interest
 Tulasi as Raj's mother
 Rajiv Kanakala as Sashi's father
 Sirisha Sougandh as Sashi's mother
 Viva Harsha
 Vennela Kishore

Music
The music of the film is composed by Arun Chiluveru.

Reception 
Ram Venkat Srikar of Cinema Express rated the film 2/5 and termed it an "emotionally hollow drama."  Srikar added that, "It is earnest story with a lot of heart buried somewhere under the cliches. Sashi aspires to endow us with an emotional viewing experience but settles for monotony and leaves us indifferent. 

The Times of India critic Thadhagath Pathi also rated the film 2 stars of five, stating that it was dull love story which lacked in originality. A reviewer from Eenadu opined that the film had a routine story and screenplay but appreciated the performances of Aadi and Surbhi.

References

External links 
 

2020s Telugu-language films
Indian romantic drama films
2021 romantic drama films